Travis Watson (born March 20, 1981) is an American professional basketball player. A 2.03 m tall power forward, he led the 2007–08 EuroLeague in rebounds with 9.7 per game while playing for Olimpia Milano.

College career
Watson played college basketball at the University of Virginia and was named to the All-Atlantic Coast Conference Second Team following his junior and senior seasons.

Professional career
Since 2003 Watson is playing in Europe. For the 2008–09 season Watson signed for Hapoel Jerusalem from the Israeli Basketball Super League. In August 2009 he signed with Žalgiris Kaunas. In July 2010, he renewed his contract and played for Žalgiris until the end of the 2010–11 season. Watson signed with Enisey Krasnoyarsk in August 2012, but the contract was terminated after he failed the medical examination. 

In July 2013, he returned to Italy and signed with Vanoli Cremona. On September 14, 2013, he parted ways with Cremona. Later that month he signed with Lugano Tigers. In the summer of 2014, he signed with CSA Steaua București. After a few year absence, Watson signed with BC Vytis of the National Basketball League in Lithuania.

Career statistics

EuroLeague

|-
| style="text-align:left;"| 2005–06
| style="text-align:left;"| Climamio Bologna
| 20 || 2 || 19.5 || .525 || .000 || .647 || 7.3 || 1.1 || 1.3 || .6 || 8.0 || 11.3
|-
| style="text-align:left;"| 2007–08
| style="text-align:left;"| AJ Milano
| 14 || 13 || 25.3 || .632 || .1000 || .443 || style="background:#CFECEC;"|9.7 || 1.2 || 1.9 || .4 || 11.7 || 18.0
|-
| style="text-align:left;"| 2009–10
| style="text-align:left;"| Žalgiris Kaunas
| 13 || 12 || 25.2 || .591 || .000 || .737 || style="background:#CFECEC;"|9.5 || 1.5 || .7 || .7 || 10.6 || 16.2
|-
| style="text-align:left;"| 2010–11
| style="text-align:left;"| Žalgiris Kaunas
| 15 || 10 || 18.0 || .543 || .000 || .605 || 4.7 || .7 || 1.0 || .5 || 6.6 || 6.4

References

External links
 Travis Watson at euroleague.net
 Travis Watson at legabasket.it 
 Travis Watson at nba.com (prospect profile)

1981 births
Living people
American expatriate basketball people in Greece
American expatriate basketball people in Israel
American expatriate basketball people in Italy
American expatriate basketball people in Lithuania
American expatriate basketball people in Switzerland
American men's basketball players
Basketball players from San Antonio
BC Žalgiris players
Centers (basketball)
Greek Basket League players
Hapoel Jerusalem B.C. players
Lugano Tigers players
Olimpia Milano players
Fortitudo Pallacanestro Bologna players
Panionios B.C. players
Parade High School All-Americans (boys' basketball)
Power forwards (basketball)
Virginia Cavaliers men's basketball players
Oak Hill Academy (Mouth of Wilson, Virginia) alumni